Micro nation may refer to:

 Micronation, entities that claim to be independent nations or states.
 Micro Nation (TV series), a 2012 Australian comedy television series.